Valentin Fernández Coria (1886–1954) was an Argentine chess player.

He was one of the strongest chess players of Argentina in the 1920s. He was repeated participant in Argentine Chess Championship in which he shared 2nd - 4th place in 1923/1924. In 1921/1922 in Montevideo Valentin Fernández Coria shared 2nd - 5th place in South American Chess Championship.

Valentin Fernández Coria played for Argentina in the unofficial Chess Olympiad:
 In 1924, at fourth board in the 1st unofficial Chess Olympiad in Paris (+2, =6, -5).

Valentin Fernández Coria played for Argentina in the Chess Olympiad:
 In 1928, at first board in the 2nd Chess Olympiad in The Hague (+1, =3, -4).

References

External links

Valentin Fernández Coria chess games at 365chess.com
Valentin Fernández Coria (other page) chess games at 365chess.com

1886 births
1954 deaths
Argentine chess players
Chess Olympiad competitors